Unlawful Entry is a 1992 American psychological thriller film directed by Jonathan Kaplan, and starring Kurt Russell, Madeleine Stowe and Ray Liotta.

The film involves a couple who befriend a lonely policeman, only for him to develop an unrequited fixation on the wife, leading to chilling consequences. The movie received generally positive reviews especially for Ray Liotta's performance who was nominated for an MTV Movie Award for Best Villain in 1993 for his portrayal of the psychopathic cop. The film was remade in Bollywood as Fareb in 1996.

Plot 
One night, an intruder enters Michael and Karen Carr's upscale Los Angeles home through their skylight, upsetting the couple's tranquility. The intruder briefly takes Karen hostage at knifepoint, before dumping her in the swimming pool and escaping. The Carrs call the police, one of whom, Pete Davis, is quickly intrigued by their politeness, and takes extra interest in their case, cutting through department red tape and quickly installs a security system in their house.

Appreciating Pete's services, the Carrs befriend him and invite him to dinner. When Michael expresses interest in getting revenge on the intruder, Pete invites him on a ride-along with his partner, Roy Cole. After dropping Cole off, Pete reveals he has arrested the man who broke into the Carrs' house and offers Michael a chance to retaliate for the attack on Karen. Michael declines, insisting that he wasn't serious about personally taking revenge, but Pete becomes insistent and demanding. After the burglar attempts escape, Pete brutally beats him before Michael orders him to stop.

Deeply suspicious of Pete's mental stability and overprotective behavior, Michael implores Karen to stay away from him, but Karen declines, believing he is overreacting. When Pete arrives at Michael's club, Michael condemns Pete's behavior and rejects their friendship, demanding that he stay away from him and Karen. After unsuccessfully attempting to cope via sex with a random woman he deems "worthless", Pete, having been already infatuated with Karen, invites her for coffee to connect with her and starts intruding in her marriage with Michael, believing that Michael is not standing up enough for Karen.

Having become jealous, angered, and bitter over Michael's rejection, Pete begins to harass him by ruining his finances, and breaks into the house after setting the alarm off to presumably check on the couple having sex. When Michael files a complaint against Pete's unwanted attentions, Pete uses his police connections to destroy Michael's business reputation, encountering bemused apathy from his own LAPD superiors. Advised by his lawyer, Michael tries to bribe Pete with $5000 and apologizes for his rejection, but Pete rejects Michael's offer, reveals his obsession with Karen, and threatens to kill him, causing Michael to warn Karen about Pete's obsession with her, further demanding that she stay away from him.

Michael turns to Cole, who orders his partner to cease his obsessing, see a shrink or face suspension. Pete then remorselessly murders Cole, blaming a known criminal, before framing Michael on drug charges by planting cocaine in the Carrs' house, enabling him to focus on Karen. Jeopardizing his attorney's finances, Michael resolves to get out on bail and handle matters himself. Back at the Carr house, Karen awakens to find Pete cooking instead of her friend and colleague, Penny.

After Pete declares his love for Karen, Karen discovers Penny's corpse, realizing that Pete brutally murdered her friend. Karen rejects Pete by holding him at gunpoint after pretending to accept him and making love with him to confiscate his gun. After refusing to leave, Karen attempts to shoot him, only to discover the gun is empty. Dismissing her as worthless, he attempts to rape her, but fails after finding his police car vandalized, realizing that Michael has returned home. The couple attempt escape, but while Karen hides in the bathroom, Pete attacks Michael and accidentally alerts the police to their house after attempting to answer a phone call posing as Michael and giving the wrong code, which Michael had changed.

Holding Michael at gunpoint outside the bathroom, Pete threatens to kill him unless Karen opens the door and escapes with him, while Michael begs Karen not to, saying Pete will kill him anyway. Karen ultimately bursts out of the room and strikes Pete in the face with an ornament, allowing Michael to punch Pete and knock him down the stairs. As the couple wait for the police to arrive, Pete regains consciousness as Michael holds him at gunpoint. Pete, believing Michael will not shoot him, tauntingly asks Michael to arrest him as a citizen, just like Michael did when Pete threatened to kill him, but Michael instead shocks Pete by shooting him until the gun is empty, ultimately killing Pete. Relieved, he and Karen then go outside and watch the police arrive.

Cast

Production

Filming
Principal photography began on October 25, 1991. Filming took place in and around Los Angeles, California. The house that was used for the Carr residence in the film is located at 546 Wilcox Ave. The school sequence was filmed at Doris Place Elementary School. The sequence where Michael is in jail was filmed at Lincoln Heights Jail. Production wrapped on February 5, 1992.

Soundtrack

The original soundtrack was composed by James Horner. It was released on Intrada records, an extended version of the soundtrack was released by La-La Land Records in 2017.

The movie featured several songs that were not included on the soundtrack. "Pa La Ocha Tambo" and "Just a Little Dream" by Eddie Palmieri, "National Crime Awareness Week (Alfred Hitchcock Presents Mix)" by Sparks, Everybody's Free to Feel Good" by Rozalla, and "Don't Go to Strangers" by J. J. Cale.

US CD (Intrada Records) track listing
All tracks written and composed by James Horner.
 "Main Title" - 3:14
 "Intruder" - 2:08
 "Being Watched" - 5:42
 "Leon's Death" - 3:01
 "Drug Bust" - 3:06
 "Bail Denied" - 2:26
 "Pete's Passion" - 11:15
 "End Credits" - 4:22

Reception

Box office
The film was released in the U.S. on June 26, 1992, opening at #2 in 1,511 theaters, an average of $6,662 per theater. Grossing $10,067,609 in the opening weekend, it went on to gross $57,138,719 in the domestic market. It was a box-office success, and brought back its $23 million budget.

Critical response
On Rotten Tomatoes, 74% of reviews are positive, with an average rating of 6.2/10. The critical consensus reads, "Unlawful Entry may not depict a particularly novel or believable situation, but tense direction and a roundly committed cast make it easy to get caught up in the moment." Metacritic, which uses a weighted average, assigned the film a score of 61 out of 100, based on 25 reviews, indicating "generally favorable reviews". Audiences polled by CinemaScore gave it an average grade of "B" on an A+ to F scale.

Roger Ebert praised director Jonathan Kaplan for giving the film's story a sense of realism with its locations, characters with "unrestrained realism" from the actors and having "undertones of a serious social drama" when confronting fears about a delusional police authority. Varietys Todd McCarthy wrote that despite being another film that follows in the mould of Fatal Attraction, he called it "a very effective victimization thriller", praising both Liotta and Russell's performances and Kaplan's direction of the script into "areas of social and class-structure observations" when dealing with unhinged police figures in an urban setting. In her review for The New York Times, Janet Maslin was critical of the three main leads lacking depth and substance in the motivations of their characters but gave credit to Liotta for giving "complexity" to his role, a solid supporting cast and the "level-headed" direction Kaplan takes with the plot, even as it stretches credibility.

See also
 List of American films of 1992
 List of films featuring home invasions

References

External links 
 
 
 
 

1992 films
1992 crime thriller films
1990s American films
1990s English-language films
1990s mystery thriller films
1990s psychological thriller films
American crime thriller films
American mystery thriller films
American police detective films
American psychological thriller films
Fictional portrayals of the Los Angeles Police Department
Films about prostitution in the United States
Films about stalking
Films scored by James Horner
Films directed by Jonathan Kaplan
Films shot in Los Angeles
Home invasions in film
Largo Entertainment films